Popstars is a Portuguese reality television series based on the Popstars international series. In Portugal, Popstars was  broadcast on the Portuguese Sociedade Independente de Comunicação (SIC) channel in 2001. The program was discontinued after one season.

The series introduced the girl group Nonstop sometimes stylized as NonStop. The group proved to be very successful especially with Portuguese youth with their hot singles "Ao Limite Eu Vou" and "Tudo Vai Mudar". The first went on to become the best played single for the year. In 2006, NonStop represented Portugal in the Eurovision Song Contest with "Coisas de Nada".

References

Popstars
Portuguese reality television series
Portuguese music television series
2001 Portuguese television series debuts
2001 Portuguese television series endings
2000s Portuguese television series
Non-New Zealand television series based on New Zealand television series